Hoseynabad-e Yangejeh (also Romanized as Ḩoseynābād-e Yangejeh and Ḩoseynābād-e Yangecheh; also known as Ḩoseynābād) is a village in Manjilabad Rural District, in the Central District of Robat Karim County, Tehran Province, Iran. At the 2006 census, its population was 118, in 26 families.

References 

Populated places in Robat Karim County